The Kansas City Southern Railway Building in Kansas City, Missouri is a building from 1914. It was listed on the National Register of Historic Places in 2004.

References

Buildings and structures in Kansas City, Missouri
Kansas City Southern Railway
Commercial buildings on the National Register of Historic Places in Missouri
Transport infrastructure completed in 1914
National Register of Historic Places in Kansas City, Missouri